Tomáš Rousek (born September 9, 1993) is a Czech professional ice hockey player. He is currently playing for EHC Waldkraiburg who currently compete in Regionalliga.

Rousek made his Czech Extraliga debut playing with Motor České Budějovice during the 2011-12 Czech Extraliga season. He also played for Mountfield HK.

References

External links

1993 births
Living people
Czech ice hockey forwards
BK Havlíčkův Brod players
Motor České Budějovice players
Sportspeople from České Budějovice
IHC Písek players
Stadion Hradec Králové players
HC Tábor players
Czech expatriate ice hockey players in Germany
Czech expatriate sportspeople in Austria
Expatriate ice hockey players in Austria